Pandhana Assembly constituency is one of the 230 Vidhan Sabha (Legislative Assembly) constituencies of Madhya Pradesh state in central India.

It is part of Khandwa District.

Election results

2018

2013

See also
 Pandhana

References

Assembly constituencies of Madhya Pradesh